The Mercedes-Benz M291 engine is a 3.5-liter flat-12 racing engine, designed, developed and produced by Mercedes-Benz, for their Group C racing program. It was introduced in 1991, along with their new Mercedes-Benz C291 prototype race car chassis.

Background
The 1991 season marked the introduction of the FIA’s new, and controversial, 3.5-liter formula which replaced the highly successful Group C category that had been used in the World Sportscar Championship since 1982, though due to a small number of entries for the 3.5-liter formula heavily penalized Group C cars (which were subject to weight penalties and started behind the new-style C1 entries on the grid) were allowed to participate in the season's C2 category.

Engine
The primary feature of the new regulations was the use of a 3.5-liter naturally aspirated engine. This made it impossible for Mercedes-Benz to use the engines from its previous Group C cars. Also, to produce similar power to the Group C cars a 3.5-liter naturally aspirated engine had to be very high-revving and be constructed from different materials in order to rev highly.

Unlike Jaguar's XJR-14 who had the readily available and proven Ford HB V8 engine from the Benetton B190B Formula One car (the engine regulations for the new 3.5-liter formula were identical to Formula One), Mercedes-Benz had to design an all-new purpose-built racing engine and its M-291 3.5L Flat-12 unit was the result.

Applications
Mercedes-Benz C291
Mercedes-Benz C292 (stillborn concept)

References

Mercedes-Benz engines
V12 engines
Engines by model
Gasoline engines by model